Ignatiaceae is a family of green algae in the class Ulvophyceae. It is the only family in the order Ignatiales.

References

External links

Ulvophyceae
Ulvophyceae families